Petsoe End is a hamlet in Emberton, which is in the Borough of Milton Keynes, in the ceremonial county of Buckinghamshire, England.

The name Petsoe is used frequently in the local area, with other local hamlets being called Petsoe Manor and Petsoe Lodge.

Petsoe was formerly a separate parish from Emberton, but was annexed to the latter parish in 1650 for ecclesiastical purposes.  There was another parish nearby, called Ekeney which was also annexed at the same time, though nothing remains of Ekeney today.

Today nothing remains of Petsoe church, though the landmarkings showing where it once stood are still discernible.

References

Hamlets in Buckinghamshire
Areas of Milton Keynes